Jeannine Cavender-Bares is a Distinguished McKnight University Professor at the University of Minnesota in the Department of Ecology, Evolution & Behavior. Her research integrates evolutionary biology, ecology, and physiology by studying the functional traits of plants, with a particular focus on oaks.

Early life and education 
Cavender-Bares grew up in Athens, Ohio. She received her B.A. in environmental sciences from Cornell University in 1990, her Masters in Forestry and Global Change from Yale University in 1992 and her PhD from Harvard University in 2000. At Harvard, Jeannine worked with Fakhri A. Bazzaz and studied the physiological and evolutionary ecology of oaks (Quercus). She then worked as a postdoctoral research fellow at the Smithsonian Environmental Research Center with Catherine Lovelock and at the French National Centre for Scientific Research in Montpellier with Serge Rambal and Richard Joffre.

Career and research 
She is a leading researcher in the field of 'eco-phylogenetics' or 'community phylogenetics' (her review has been cited over 2000 times), and organized a special issue of the journal Ecology on that topic. Cavender-Bares' research group uses concepts from the evolutionary history of plant physiology to understand how ecosystems function in the face of global climate change, as well as how changes in plant function and diversity can be remotely sensed.

Cavender-Bares was one of the coordinating lead authors of the Intergovernmental Science-Policy Platform on Biodiversity and Ecosystem Services (IPBES) report for the Americas. The IPBES is an independent intergovernmental body supported by multiple nations with the mission to "strengthen the science-policy interface for biodiversity and ecosystem services for the conservation and sustainable use of biodiversity, long-term human well-being and sustainable development." In 2016, she helped launch the Oaks of the Americas Conservation Network, which promotes the protection of oak species across North America.

She was lead principal investigator of the NSF/NASA Dimensions of biodiversity project "Linking remotely sensed optical diversity to genetic, phylogenetic and functional diversity to predict ecosystem processes" and lead editor for the open access book Remote Sensing of Plant Biodiversity. She serves on the Governing Board of the Ecological Society of America and was appointed to serve on the public facing Biological Sciences Advisory Committee (BIO AC) to the National Science Foundation (NSF) from 2019-2021. She is the Director of the NSF-funded biology integration institute ASCEND on using spectral biology and predictive models for the study of biodiversity and global change.

Publications
As of 2022, Jeannine has published over 170 peer-reviewed journal articles or international assessments and 10 book chapters that have been cited over 27,000 times.

As indexed by Google scholar some of her most important papers as first author are:

 J Cavender-Bares, FD Schneider, JM Santos, et al. (2022). Integrating remote sensing with ecology and evolution to advance biodiversity conservation. Nat Ecol Evol 6, 506–519.
 J Cavender-Bares (2019), Diversification, adaptation, and community assembly of the American oaks (Quercus), a model clade for integrating ecology and evolution. New Phytol, 221, 669-692.
 J Cavender-Bares, S Polasky, E King, and P Balvanera (2015). A sustainability framework for assessing trade-offs in ecosystem services. Ecology and Society 20, no. 1. 
 J Cavender-Bares, A González-Rodríguez, D Eaton, A Hipp, A Beulke, P Manos (2015). Phylogeny and biogeography of the American live oaks (Quercus subsection Virentes): a genomic and population genetics approach. Mol Ecol, 24, 3668-3687.
 J Cavender-Bares, KH Kozak, PVA Fine, SW Kembel (2009). The merging of community ecology and phylogenetic biology. Ecology Letters 12 (7), 693–715.
 J Cavender-Bares, A Keen, B Miles (2006). Phylogenetic structure of Floridian plant communities depends on taxonomic and spatial scale. Ecology 87 (sp7), S109-S122.
 J Cavender-Bares, DD Ackerly, DA Baum, FA Bazzaz (2004). Phylogenetic overdispersion in Floridian oak communities. The American Naturalist 163 (6), 823–843.

J Cavender-Bares, K Kitajima, FA Bazzaz (2004). Multiple trait associations in relation to habitat differentiation among 17 Floridian oak species. Ecological Monographs 74 (4), 635–662.
 J Cavender-Bares, FA Bazzaz (2000). Changes in drought response strategies with ontogeny in Quercus rubra: implications for scaling from seedlings to mature tree s. Oecologia 124 (1), 8-18.

References

External links
 

Year of birth missing (living people)
Living people
University of Minnesota faculty
Harvard University alumni
21st-century American scientists
Women ecologists
21st-century American women scientists
Fellows of the American Academy of Arts and Sciences
American women academics